

Bradford Kames is the name given to a Site of Special Scientific Interest (SSSI) in north Northumberland, England. The site is an esker, a ridge of glacial till deposited in the Pleistocene epoch.

Location and natural features
The esker is composed of a ridge and associated mounds, on a site of circa  length orientated in a north-north-west - south-south-east direction, with the ground falling to the east. The SSSI citation for Bradford Kames describes it as providing "a striking example of the complex landform and sediment associations that developed during the wastage of the last ice sheet."

At the north end of the site, Spindlestones Pond provides a habitat for great crested newts.

The condition of Bradford Kames was judged to be favourable in 2011.

See also
List of Sites of Special Scientific Interest in Northumberland

References

External links
Natural England SSSI record for Bradford Kames

Eskers
Sites of Special Scientific Interest in Northumberland
Sites of Special Scientific Interest notified in 1969